Blatno is a municipality and village in Louny District in the Ústí nad Labem Region of the Czech Republic. It has about 500 inhabitants.

Administrative parts
The village of Malměřice is an administrative part of Blatno.

References

Villages in Louny District